The Love of Hypnosis is an upcoming Chinese television series based on the eponymous manhua Nan Yanzhai Bilu (南烟斋笔录) by Ke Xiaosha and Zuo Xiaoling. It stars Liu Yifei and Jing Boran.

Synopsis
The story begins when a white-collar worker discovers old records in her childhood home which takes the story to the end of Qing and the beginning of the Republican era. The female protagonist is a woman with a unique ability and a special mission. She can help men and women through their emotional problems and leave them with no regrets regardless of the outcome. Yet her own experience with love is not without troubles of its own.

Cast

Main

Supporting

Production
The series is jointly directed by four directors - Liu Haibo (Chinese Style Relationship), Zhang Silin (Precious Youth), Yip Chiu-yee (Looking Back in Anger) and Wu Jiuxi (Sunny Piggy). Wu Jiuxi, a frequent collaborater of Tsui Hark, is also the screenwriter of the series.

Principal production began on November 28, 2017 at Hengdian World Studios and wrapped up on June 15, 2018.
The main location set, "Nanyan Studio" measures up to 12000 square meters (with 3500 square meters of floor area) and took three months to built from scratch. Wang Gang (Ordinary World) acts as the art director for the series. It was reported that the sets will be kept intact at Hengdian Studio even after filming for the series has completed. The costumes for the series is designed by William Chang.

The series marks Liu Yifei's comeback to the small screen after 12 years.

References

External links
 
 
 
 

Chinese fantasy television series
Chinese mystery television series
Chinese period television series
Television shows based on manhua
Upcoming television series